Ye or Dongye, which means the Eastern Ye, was a Korean chiefdom which occupied portions of the northeastern Korean peninsula from roughly 3rd-century BC to around early 5th-century AD. It bordered Goguryeo and Okjeo to the north, Jinhan to the south, and China's Lelang Commandery to the west. Today, this territory consists of the provinces of South Hamgyŏng and Kangwon in North Korea, and Gangwon in South Korea.

History

Ye appears in history as a vassal state of Goguryeo. In early 5th-century, however, King Gwanggaeto the Great of Goguryeo annexed Ye, leading to Goguryeo's domination of the entire northern portion of the Korean peninsula and most of Manchuria. A small part of Ye in the south was absorbed into Silla.

Haslla (何瑟羅) (present-day Gangneung), Bulnaeye (不耐穢) (present-day Anbyon County), Hwaryeo (華麗) (present-day Kumya County) are known as the countries established by Ye. According to a recent study, Siljikgok (present-day Samcheok) is also seen as an area of the ye culture.

According to the Book of the Later Han and Records of the Three Kingdoms, fellow soldiers are as good at infantry as Okjeo. They had a sense of homogeneity with Goguryeo. It is said that it used 3 丈 long spear as a weapon and supported the army as a vassal of Goguryeo.

People and culture
The Ye people considered themselves to be the same people as the people of Goguryeo, and shared their language and ethnic origins with the people of Okjeo and Goguryeo. This may indicate that Dongye also shared a common origin with Buyeo and Gojoseon. The population was recorded to be 280,000 families.

Very little information about Ye has survived; most of the extant information comes from the discussion of the Eastern barbarians in the Chinese Records of Three Kingdoms. The custom of "Mucheon" (무천, 舞天), a festival of worshipping heaven through song and dance in the 10th month, is mentioned in some records. This appears to have been closely related to the Goguryeo festival of Dongmaeng, held at the same time of year, which also incorporated martial displays. The people worshiped the tiger as a deity.

The economy of Ye was based primarily on agriculture, including sericulture and hemp cultivation. The Mucheon festival was largely aimed at securing a good harvest in the coming year. Their agriculture appears to have been well-organised at the village level. Ye law meted out stiff penalties for those who encroached on communal land.

See also
Three Kingdoms of Korea
History of Korea
Yemaek

Notes

Bibliography

Ancient peoples
Early Korean history
Former countries in Korean history
3rd-century BC establishments
5th-century disestablishments
States and territories established in the 3rd century BC
States and territories disestablished in the 5th century